The Nadarivatu Dam, also known as the Korolevu Dam, is a concrete gravity dam on the upper reaches of the Sigatoka River in Nadarivatu District of Nadroga-Navosa Province, Fiji. The primary purpose of the dam is to generate hydroelectric power in a  run-of-the-river scheme. The Nadarivatu Hydropower Scheme was first identified in 1977 during a hydropower study. Details plans for the project were developed in 2002 and major construction began in 2009. The power station was commissioned on 7 September 2012 but an inauguration ceremony led by Prime Minister Frank Bainimarama was held a week later on 14 September. Funding and loans for the project was provided by several organizations to include the China Development Bank (US$70 Million), Fiji Electricity Authority bonds (US$50 million), ADZ Bank (US$30 million). The power station contains two  Pelton turbine-generators.

See also

Monasavu Dam

References

Dams completed in 2012
Energy infrastructure completed in 2012
Dams in Fiji
Hydroelectric power stations in Fiji
Gravity dams
Run-of-the-river power stations
Nadroga-Navosa Province